Villiers-en-Plaine is a commune in the Deux-Sèvres department in western France.

Demographic evolution

See also
Communes of the Deux-Sèvres department

References

External links

Official site

Communes of Deux-Sèvres